Ormsby County was a county in Nevada Territory from 1861 to 1864 and in the State of Nevada from 1864 until 1969. It contained Carson City, the county seat, and later, the state capital, founded two years earlier.

Name 
It was named after Major William Ormsby, one of the original settlers of Carson City, killed along with seventy-five other men in 1860, in an unsuccessful attempt to subdue a perceived uprising of Paiute people near Pyramid Lake, Nevada, which was at the time part of Utah Territory.

History 

Ormsby County was established in 1861 with creation of Nevada Territory. The county's population dwindled significantly after the gold rush days. By the late 1940s, it was little more than Carson City and a few surrounding hamlets to the west. Discussions began about merging Carson City with Ormsby County. However, the effort never got beyond the planning stages until 1966, when a statewide referendum formally approved the merger. The required constitutional amendment was passed in 1968. On April 1, 1969, Ormsby County and Carson City officially merged as the Consolidated Municipality of Carson City.

Politics

See also
 Empire City, Nevada - Former town of Ormsby County, that was merged into Carson City
 Stewart Indian School - Former Indian school and separate village from Carson, merged into Carson City with the consolidation
 List of former United States counties
 List of Nevada counties

References

1861 establishments in Nevada Territory
1969 disestablishments in Nevada
Former counties of Nevada
History of Carson City, Nevada
Populated places disestablished in 1969
Populated places established in 1861